Kateri Tekakwitha ( in Mohawk), given the name Tekakwitha, baptized as Catherine and informally known as Lily of the Mohawks (1656 – April 17, 1680), is a Catholic saint and virgin who was an Algonquin–Mohawk. Born in the Mohawk village of Ossernenon, on the south side of the Mohawk River in present-day New York State, she contracted smallpox in an epidemic; her family died and her face was scarred. She converted to Catholicism at age nineteen, when she was baptized and given the Christian name Kateri in honor of Catherine of Siena. Refusing to marry, she left her village and moved for the remaining five years of her life to the Jesuit mission village of Kahnawake, south of Montreal on the St. Lawrence River in New France, now Canada.

Kateri Tekakwitha took a vow of perpetual virginity. Upon her death at the age of 24, witnesses said that her scars vanished minutes later, and her face appeared radiant and beautiful. Known for her virtue of chastity and mortification of the flesh, as well as being shunned by some of her tribe for her religious conversion to Catholicism, she is the fourth Native American to be venerated in the Catholic Church.

She was beatified in 1980 by Pope John Paul II, and canonized by Pope Benedict XVI at Saint Peter's Basilica on 21 October 2012. Various miracles and supernatural events are attributed to her intercession.

Early life and education

Tekakwitha is the name the girl was given by her Mohawk people. It translates to "She who bumps into things." She was born around 1656 in the Mohawk village of Ossernenon in Northeastern New York state. A nineteenth-century claim that Auriesville developed at the site of Ossernenon has been disproved by archaeological findings, according to Dean R. Snow and other specialists in Native American history in New York.

She was the daughter of Kenneronkwa, a Mohawk chief, and Kahenta, an Algonquin woman, who had been captured in a raid, then adopted and assimilated into the tribe. Kahenta had been baptized Catholic and educated by French missionaries in Trois-Rivières, east of Montreal. Mohawk warriors captured her and took her to their homeland. Kahenta eventually married Kenneronkwa. Tekakwitha was the first of their two children. A brother followed.

Tekakwitha's original village was highly diverse. The Mohawk were absorbing many captured natives of other tribes, particularly their competitors, the Huron, to replace people who died from warfare or diseases such as measles and chickenpox. While from different backgrounds, such captives were adopted into the tribe to become full members and were expected to assimilate as Mohawk fully.

The Mohawk suffered a severe smallpox epidemic from 1661 to 1663, causing high fatalities. When Tekakwitha was around four years old, her baby brother and both her parents died of smallpox. She survived but was left with facial scars and impaired eyesight. She was adopted by her father's sister and her husband, a chief of the Turtle Clan. Before the epidemic, in 1659, some Mohawk had founded a new village on the north side of the river, which they called Caughnawaga ("at the wild water" in the Mohawk language). Survivors of Ossernenon moved to that village.

The Jesuits' account of Tekakwitha said that she was a modest girl who avoided social gatherings; she covered much of her head with a blanket because of the smallpox scars. They said that, as an orphan, the girl was under the care of uninterested relatives. According to Mohawk practices, she was probably well taken care of by her clan, her mother and uncle's extended family, with whom she lived in the longhouse. She became skilled at traditional women's arts, which included making clothing and belts from animal skins; weaving mats, baskets, and boxes from reeds and grasses; and preparing food from game, crops, and gathered produce. She took part in the women's seasonal planting and intermittent weeding. As was the custom, she was pressured to consider marriage around age thirteen, but she refused.

Upheaval and invasions
Tekakwitha grew up in a period of upheaval, as the Mohawk interacted with French and Dutch colonists, who were competing in the lucrative fur trade. The Mohawk initially traded with the Dutch, who had settled in Albany and Schenectady. The French traded with and were allied with the Huron.

Trying to make inroads in Iroquois territory, the French attacked the Mohawk in present-day central New York in 1666. After driving the people from their homes, the French burned the three Mohawk villages on the south side of the river, destroying the longhouses, wigwams, and the women's corn and squash fields. Tekakwitha, around ten years old, fled with her new family into a cold October forest.

After the defeat by the French forces, the Mohawk were forced into a peace treaty that required them to accept Jesuit missionaries in their villages. The Jesuits established a mission near Auriesville, New York. While there, the Jesuits studied Mohawk and other native languages to reach the people. They spoke of Christianity in terms with which the Mohawk could identify. In his work on Tekakwitha, Darren Bonaparte notes the parallels between Mohawk and Christian belief elements. For instance, the Jesuits used the word Karonhià:ke, the Mohawk name for Sky World, as the word for heaven in the Lord's Prayer in Mohawk. "This was not just a linguistic shortcut, but a conceptual bridge from one cosmology to another."

The Mohawk crossed their river to rebuild Caughnawaga on the north bank, west of the present-day town of Fonda, New York. In 1667, when Tekakwitha was 11 years old, she met the Jesuit missionaries Jacques Frémin, Jacques Bruyas, and Jean Pierron, who had come to the village. Her uncle opposed any contact with them because he did not want her to convert to Christianity. One of his older daughters had already left Caughnawaga to go to Kahnawake, the Catholic mission village across the St. Lawrence River from Montreal.

In the summer of 1669, several hundred Mohican warriors, advancing from the east, launched a dawn attack on Caughnawaga. Rousing quickly to the defense, Mohawk villagers fought off the invaders, who kept Caughnawaga under siege for three days. Tekakwitha, now around 13 years old, joined other girls to help priest Jean Pierron tend to the wounded, bury the dead, and carry food and water to the defending warriors on the palisades.

When reinforcements arrived from other Mohawk villages, the defenders drove the Mohican warriors into retreat. The victorious Mohawk pursued the Mohican warriors, attacking them in the forest, killing over 80, and capturing several others. Returning to Caughnawaga amid the widespread celebration, the victors tortured the captive Mohicans—thirteen men and four women—for two afternoons in succession, planning to execute them on the third. Pierron, tending to the captives, implored the torturers to stop, but they ignored him. Pierron instructed the captives in Catholic doctrine as best he could and baptized them before they died under torture.

Feast of the Dead
Later in 1669, the Iroquois Feast of the Dead, held every ten years, was convened at Caughnawaga. Some Oneida people came, along with Onondaga led by their famous sachem Garakontié. The remains of Tekakwitha's parents, along with the many others who had died in the previous decade, were to be carefully exhumed so that their souls could be released to wander to the spirit land to the west.

According to a 1936 book about Tekakwitha, Pierron attacked the Feast of the Dead's beliefs and logic. The assembled Iroquois, upset over his remarks, ordered him to be silent. But Pierron continued, telling the Iroquois to give up their "superstitious" rites. Under Garakontié's protection, Pierron finished his speech. He demanded that to secure continued friendship with the French, the Iroquois give up their Feast of the Dead, their faith in dreams as a guide to action, and the worship of their war god. At length, the assembled Iroquois relented. Exchanging gifts with priest Pierron, they promised to give up the customs he had denounced. Garakontié later converted to Christianity.

A chief converts
In 1671, Mohawk chief Ganeagowa, who had led his warriors to victory against the Mohican, returned from a long hunting trip in the north to announce he had become a Christian. He had come upon the Catholic Iroquois village set up by Jesuits at La Prairie, southeast of Montreal. There he made friendly contact with priest Jacques Frémin, who had served as a missionary in Mohawk country. Influenced by the Iroquois villagers' Catholic faith and his wife Satékon, Ganeagowa received instruction for several months from Frémin, who accepted him into the Church.

Family pressures
By the time Tekakwitha turned 17, around 1673, her adoptive mother (her father's sister) and aunt (uncle's sister) had become concerned over her lack of interest in marriage. They tried to arrange her marriage to a young Mohawk man by instructing him to sit beside her. They indicated to Tekakwitha that the young man wanted to marry her. Accordingly, they pressured her to offer him a certain dish made with corn. Iroquois custom regarded this as a woman's sign of openness to marriage. Tekakwitha fled the cabin and hid from her family in a nearby field. Tekakwitha was said to have been punished by her aunts with ridicule, threats, and harsh workloads. But Tekakwitha continued to resist marriage. Eventually, her aunts gave up their efforts to get her to marry.

In the spring of 1674, at age eighteen, Tekakwitha met the Jesuit priest Jacques de Lamberville, who was visiting the village. Most of the women were out harvesting corn, but Tekakwitha had injured her foot and was in the cabin. In the presence of others, Tekakwitha told him her story and her desire to become a Christian. After this, she started studying the catechism with him.

Conversion and Kahnawake
Lamberville wrote in his journal in the years after her death about Tekakwitha. This text described her before she was baptized as a mild-mannered girl and behaved very well. Lamberville also stated that Kateri did everything she could to stay holy in a secular society, which often caused minor conflicts with her longhouse residents. These conflicts suggested that there was no violence, which contradicts future texts.

Judging that she was ready, Lamberville baptized Tekakwitha at the age of 19, on Easter Sunday, April 18, 1676. Tekakwitha was renamed "Catherine" after St. Catherine of Siena (Kateri was the Mohawk form of the name).

After Kateri was baptized, she remained in Caughnawauga for another six months. Some Mohawks opposed her conversion and accused her of sorcery. Lamberville suggested that she go to the Jesuit mission of Kahnawake, located south of Montreal on the St. Lawrence River, where other native converts had gathered. Catherine joined them in 1677.

Tekakwitha was said to have put thorns on her sleeping mat and lain on them while praying for her relatives' conversion and forgiveness. Piercing the body to draw blood was a traditional practice of the Mohawk and other Iroquois nations. She lived at Kahnawake the remaining two years of her life. She learned more about Christianity under her mentor Anastasia, who taught her about the practice of repenting for one's sins. [Citation Needed]

Father Cholonec wrote that Tekakwitha said:

The Church considers that in 1679, with her decision on the Feast of the Annunciation, Tekakwitha's conversion was truly completed, and with regard to biographies of the early Jesuits, she is regarded as the "first Iroquois virgin". Although Tekakwitha is rather often regarded as a consecrated virgin, she could, owing to circumstances, never receive the Consecration of Virgins by a bishop. Nevertheless, the United States Association of Consecrated Virgins took Kateri Tekakwitha as its patroness.

Mission du Sault St. Louis: Kahnawake
The Jesuits had founded Kahnawake for the religious conversion of the natives. When it began, the natives built their traditional longhouses for residences. They also built a longhouse to be used as a chapel by the Jesuits. As a missionary settlement, Kahnawake was at risk of being attacked by the Iroquois Confederacy members who had not converted to Catholicism. (While it attracted other Iroquois, it was predominantly Mohawk, the prominent tribe in eastern New York.)

After Catherine's arrival, she shared the longhouse of her older sister and her husband. She would have known other people in the longhouse who had migrated from their former village of Gandaouagué (Caughnawaga). Her mother's close friend, Anastasia Tegonhatsiongo, was clan matron of the longhouse. Anastasia and other Mohawk women introduced Tekakwitha to the regular practices of Christianity. This was normal for the women in the village, with many of the missionaries being preoccupied with other religious tasks. Pierre Cholenec reported that "all the Iroquois who come here and then become Christians owe their conversion mainly to the zeal of their relatives". Kahnawake was a village set-up like normal Iroquois villages, moving from location to location after running out of natural resources, such as timber and fresh game. The village was originally not wholly French but with northward migration towards Canada started by the Five Nations, the village was starting to gain more and more Native members. According to Greer, the happenstance of this village coming together and gaining traction was not due to any specific reason. The Five Nations all happened to start migrating north around the same time, without any communication between them. In Kahnawake, there was representation from multiple tribes and when the French came, there were people from different ethnicities. The village was recognized by New France as well, it was given autonomy to deal with the problems that would arise. They were also able to form a friendship with New York through this autonomy.

The trade that occurred in Kahnawake was the standard in that area, with most of it being furs and pelts. The division between the French Church and the Natives was clear-cut in the village, with few interactions between the two groups. With the two groups being distanced from each other, Chauchetière noted the unity that the Native group seemed to have.

There was an outbreak of war between the different tribes that Kahnawake was dragged into that lasted around two and a half years.

Chauchetière and Cholenec
Claude Chauchetière and Pierre Cholenec were Jesuit priests who played important roles in Tekakwitha's life. Both were based in New France and Kahnawake. Chauchetière was the first to write a biography of Tekakwitha's life, followed by Cholenec, in 1695 and 1696, respectively. Cholenec arrived in New France in 1672, before Chauchetière. Cholenec introduced whips, hair shirts and iron girdles, traditional items of Catholic mortification, to the converts at Kahnawake. He wanted them to adopt these rather than use Mohawk ritual practices. Both Chauchetière and Tekakwitha arrived in Kahnawake the same year, in 1677.

He later wrote about having been very impressed by her, as he had not expected a native to be so pious. Chauchetière came to believe that Catherine Tekakwitha was a saint. Jesuits generally thought that the natives needed Christian guidance to be set on the right path. Chauchetière acknowledged that close contact with and deeper knowledge of the natives in Kahnawake changed some of his set notions about the people and differences among human cultures. In his biography of Kateri, he stressed her "charity, industry, purity, and fortitude." In contrast, Cholenec stressed her virginity, perhaps to counter white stereotypes at the time characterizing Indian women as promiscuous.

Penances
Tekakwitha believed in the value of offered suffering. She did not eat very much and was said to add undesirable tastes to her food. She would lie on a mat with thorns. There was a custom among some Native American peoples of the time of piercing oneself with thorns in thanksgiving for some good or an offering for oneself or others' needs. Knowing the terrible burns given to prisoners, she burned herself. Her spiritual counselor, Anastasia, seems to have encouraged her penances. With her friend Marie-Thérèse, Tekakwitha readily took up penances. Her health had always been poor, and it weakened. Marie-Thérèse sought the help of Chauchetière. He scolded the young women, saying that penance must be used in moderation. He told the two that they must have him approve their penances lest they become unreasonable. Tekakwitha listened to the priest. From then on, Tekakwitha practiced whatever penance the priest would allow her, but nothing more.

Friendship with Marie-Thérèse
Upon her arrival in the Christian community, Catherine befriended Marie Thérèse Tegaianguenta. They prayed together often. Marie Skarichions told Catherine and Marie-Thérèse about religious women. Through their mutual quest, the two women had a strong "spiritual friendship," as described by the Jesuits. The two women influenced a circle of associates. When they asked the Jesuits for permission to form a group of native disciples, they were told they were too "young in faith" for such a group. The women continued to practice their faith together.

Death and appearances
Around Holy Week of 1680, friends noted that Tekakwitha's health was failing. When people knew she had but a few hours left, villagers gathered together, accompanied by the priests Chauchetière and Cholenec, the latter providing the last rites. Catherine Tekakwitha died at around 15:00 (3 p.m.) on Holy Wednesday, April 17, 1680, at the age of 23 or 24, in the arms of her friend Marie-Therèse. Chauchetière reports her final words were, "Jesus, Mary, I love you."

After her death, the people noticed a physical change. Cholenec later wrote, "This face, so marked and swarthy, suddenly changed about a quarter of an hour after her death and became in a moment so beautiful and so white that I observed it immediately." Her smallpox scars were said to disappear.

Tekakwitha purportedly appeared to three individuals in the weeks after her death; her mentor Anastasia Tegonhatsiongo, her friend Marie-Therèse Tegaiaguenta, and Chauchetière. Anastasia said that, while crying over the death of her spiritual daughter, she looked up to see Catherine "kneeling at the foot" of her mattress, "holding a wooden cross that shone like the sun." Marie-Thérèse reported that she was awakened at night by a knocking on her wall, and a voice asked if she were awake, adding, "I've come to say good-bye; I'm on my way to heaven." Marie-Thérèse went outside but saw no one; she heard a voice murmur, "Adieu, Adieu, go tell the father that I'm going to heaven." Chauchetière meanwhile said he saw Catherine at her grave; he said she appeared in "baroque splendor; for two hours he gazed upon her" and "her face lifted toward heaven as if in ecstasy."

Chauchetière had a chapel built near Kateri's gravesite. By 1684, pilgrimages had begun to honor her there. The Jesuits turned her bones to dust and set the ashes within the "newly rebuilt mission chapel." This symbolized her presence on earth, and her remains were sometimes used as relics for healing.

Epitaph

Tekakwitha's gravestone reads:

The first account of Kateri Tekakwitha was not published until 1715. Because of Tekakwitha's unique path to chastity, she is often referred to as a lily, a traditional symbol of purity associated with the Virgin Mary since the medieval period. Religious images of Tekakwitha are often decorated with a lily and cross, with feathers or turtle as cultural accessories alluding to her Native American birth. Colloquial terms for Tekakwitha are The Lily of the Mohawks (most notable), the Mohawk Maiden, the Pure and Tender Lily, the Flower among True Men, the Lily of Purity and The New Star of the New World. Her tribal neighbors referred to her as "the fairest flower that ever bloomed among the redmen." Her virtues are considered an ecumenical bridge between Mohawk and European cultures.

Veneration

For some time after her death, Kateri Tekakwitha was considered an honorary yet unofficial patroness of Montreal, Canada, and the Americas' Indigenous peoples. Fifty years after her death, a convent for Native American nuns opened in Mexico. They prayed for her and supported her canonization.

Indian Catholic missions and bishops in the 1880s wrote a petition initiating the veneration of Kateri Tekakwitha. In that petition, they stated that she was pure and holy and a gift unto the Native Americans. They asked for the venerations of Tekakwitha and the Jesuits Isaac Jogues and Brother René Goupil, two Catholic missionaries who had been slain by the Mohawk in Osernnenon a few decades before Kateri's birth. They concluded their petition by stating that these venerations would help encourage Catholicism among other Native Americans.

The process for Kateri Tekakwitha's canonization was initiated by United States Catholics at the Third Plenary Council of Baltimore in 1885, followed by Canadian Catholics. Some 906 Native Americans signed 27 letters in the US and Canada urging her canonization.

On January 3, 1943, Pope Pius XII declared her venerable. She was beatified as Catherine Tekakwitha on June 22, 1980, by Pope John Paul II.

On December 19, 2011, the Congregation for the Causes of Saints certified a second miracle through her intercession, signed by Pope Benedict XVI, which paved the way for pending canonization. On February 18, 2012, Pope Benedict XVI decreed that Tekakwitha be canonized. Speaking in Latin, he used the form "Catharina Tekakwitha"; the official booklet of the ceremony referred to her in English and Italian as "Kateri Tekakwitha." She was canonized on October 21, 2012, by Pope Benedict XVI. In the official canonization rite booklet, "Catherine" is used in the English and French biographies and "Kateri" in the translation of the rite itself. She is the first Native American woman of North America to be canonized by the Catholic Church.

In 2022, the Episcopal Church of the United States gave final approval to a feast dedicated to Kateri on 17 April on the liturgical calendar.

Kateri Tekakwitha is featured in four national shrines in the United States: the National Shrine of Blessed Kateri Tekakwitha in Fonda, New York; the National Shrine of the North American Martyrs in Auriesville, New York; the Basilica of the National Shrine of the Immaculate Conception in Washington, D.C.; and The National Shrine of the Cross in the Woods, an open-air sanctuary in Indian River, Michigan. The latter shrine's design was inspired by Kateri's habit of placing small wooden crosses throughout the woods. One statue on the grounds shows her cradling a cross in her arms, surrounded by turtles.

A statue of the Saint is installed outside the Basilica of Sainte-Anne-de-Beaupré in Quebec, Canada. Another is installed at the Cathedral Basilica of St. Francis of Assisi in Santa Fe, New Mexico.

Kateri Tekakwitha has been featured in recently created religious works. In 2007, the Grand Retablo, a 40-foot-high work by Spanish artisans, was installed behind the main altar of the Mission Basilica San Juan Capistrano in Orange County, California. It features Catherine Tekakwitha, Junipero Serra, St. Joseph, and Francis of Assisi.

A bronze statue of Kateri Tekawitha kneeling in prayer was installed in 2008, created by artist Cynthia Hitschler, along the devotional walkway leading to the Shrine of Our Lady of Guadalupe, La Crosse, Wisconsin. The shrine in La Crosse considers Kateri an especially fitting patron saint; as its website explains, "As a Native American, Saint Kateri is one of the first flowers of heroic sanctity in North America; more, her sanctity was nurtured and strengthened by a strong devotion to Mary, especially through the Holy Rosary."
 A life-size statue of Kateri is located at the National Shrine Basilica of Our Lady of Fatima in Lewiston, New York.
 A bronze figure of Kateri is included on the bronze front doors of St. Patrick's Cathedral in New York City.
 The Maryknoll Sisters at Ossining, New York have had a statue of Saint Kateri Tekakwitha on their grounds since 1939. It was a gift from the family of Mary Theodore Farley, a Sister of Maryknoll. The statue honors the Maryknoll Sisters' origins as a U.S. mission congregation.
 A statue of St. Kateri Tekakwitha was installed in the courtyard of St. Patrick's church in the St. Stanislaus Kostka parish of Pittsburgh, Pennsylvania.
 A garden section of the Holy Cross Chapel Mausoleum in North Arlington, New Jersey, has been dedicated to the memory of Saint Kateri Tekakwitha, a life-size bronze statue of the saint releasing a flight of doves was installed here.
 A Place of Hope Shrine of St. Kateri is located in Paris, Stark County, Ohio. It was dedicated by Victoria Summers (Oneida) to honor the miracles of St. Kateri Tekakwitha.
 A larger-than-life statue of St. Kateri stands in St. Vincent de Paul Catholic Church in Rogers, Arkansas.
 A mosaic image of St. Kateri is on the wall of St. Mary of the Cataract Catholic Church in Niagara Falls, New York.
 A bronze statue by artist Kaye Guerin Marks, based on the drawing by Father Chauchetière, is located at Saint Kateri Tekakwitha Catholic Church in Sisseton, South Dakota.
 A bronze statue is located in the courtyard at Saint Joseph Husband of Mary Catholic Church in Las Vegas, Nevada.
 There is a bronze statue of St. Kateri at the Immaculate Heart of Mary Catholic Church in Page, Arizona.
 There is a stained glass window of Kateri Tekakwitha in the 2007 Mary Queen of Peace chapel at the Church of Christ the King, Tulsa, Oklahoma

Miracles

Joseph Kellogg was a Protestant child captured by Natives in the eighteenth century and eventually returned to his home. Twelve months later, he caught smallpox. The Jesuits helped treat him, but he was not recovering. They had relics from Tekakwitha's grave but did not want to use them on a non-Catholic. One Jesuit told Kellogg that if he would become a Catholic, help would come to him. Joseph did so. The Jesuit gave him a piece of decayed wood from Kateri's coffin, which is said to have made him heal. The historian Allan Greer takes this account to mean that Tekakwitha was known in 18th-century New France, and she was already perceived to have healing abilities.

Other miracles were attributed to Kateri: Father Rémy recovered his hearing, and a nun in Montreal was cured by using items formerly belonging to Kateri. Such incidents were evidence that Kateri was possibly a saint. Following the death of a person, sainthood is symbolized by events that show the rejection of death. It is also represented by a duality of pain and neutralization of the other's pain (all shown by her reputed miracles in New France). Chauchetière told settlers in La Prairie to pray to Kateri for intercession with illnesses. Due to the Jesuits' superior system of publicizing material, his words and Kateri's fame were said to reach Jesuits in China and their converts.

As people believed in her healing powers, some collected earth from her gravesite and wore it in bags as a relic. One woman said she was saved from pneumonia ("grande maladie du rhume"); she gave the pendant to her husband, who was healed from his disease.

On December 19, 2011, Pope Benedict XVI approved the second miracle needed for Kateri's canonization. The authorized miracle dates from 2006, when a young boy in Washington state survived a severe flesh-eating bacterium. Doctors had been unable to stop the disease's progress by surgery and advised his parents he was likely to die. The boy received the sacrament of Anointing of the Sick from a Catholic priest. As the boy is half Lummi Indian, the parents said they prayed to Tekakwitha for divine intercession, as did their family and friends, and an extended network contacted through their son's classmates. Sister Kateri Mitchell visited the boy's bedside and placed a relic of Tekakwitha, a bone fragment, against his body and prayed together with his parents. The next day, the infection stopped its progression.

Controversy
Mohawk scholar Orenda Boucher noted that despite extensive support for the canonization of Tekakwitha, some traditional Mohawk see her as a connection to the worst aspects of colonialism. They do not believe that she embodied or reflected traditional Mohawk womanhood. Yet, the same article quotes Russell Roundpoint, director of the Mohawk history and cultural center at Akwesasne, who said her sainthood is "not a contentious issue by any stretch of the imagination," and that the "Mohawk people are very proud of the fact that she has attained such a high level."

Some American Protestants responded negatively to Tekakwitha's veneration. Historian Allan Greer researched connections between her veneration and anti-Catholicism in America, concluding that Catholics identified with her in a largely Protestant American society that viewed Catholics as foreign. Protestant newspapers such as the Methodist Review warned readers to be wary of Kateri's canonization.

Cultural references
She captured the imagination of many. More than 300 books have been published in more than 20 languages on the life of Kateri Tekakwitha. The historian K. I. Koppedrayer has suggested that the Catholic Church fathers' hagiography of Tekakwitha reflected "trials and rewards of the European presence in the New World." 

American composer Nellie von Gerichten Smith (1871–1952) created an opera entitled Lily of the Mohawks: Kateri Tekakwitha (text by Edward C. La More). It was not the first stage performance of her life; Joseph Clancy's play,The Princess of the Mohawks, was performed often by schoolchildren starting in the 1930s.

Tekakwitha has been featured in 20th-century novels and at least one from the 21st century:
 Leonard Cohen, Beautiful Losers (1966);
 William T. Vollmann, Fathers and Crows (1992), the second novel of the Seven Dreams: A Book of North American Landscapes series, includes her as a character, together with French colonists and priests.
 Victor O'Connell, Eaglechild (2016) a modern story in which a Spanish countess travels to Quebec to ask the saint to be the spiritual head of mother's council designed to raise her only child as part of her grand scheme to make restitution for the harm done to the aboriginal peoples of the Americas by her family and other colonists. A climactic scene in the plot of the novel takes place in the church at Khanawake, raising issues about customary adoptions.

Novelist Diane Glancy (who is of Cherokee descent) was the first Native American writer to make Tekakwitha the main focus of her 2009 novel, The Reason for Crows.

In an episode of the French animation series Clémentine, the time-traveling main character Clémentine Dumant meets and befriends a younger version of Tekakwitha. She is portrayed as a shy teenager who is isolated and harassed by her peers after her conversion, but with Clémentine's help, she earns their love and respect.

Brooklyn-based Irish singer-songwriter Niall Connolly includes a song titled Lily of the Mohawks on his 2013 album, Sound. The song was inspired when he noticed an image of Kateri Tekakwitha on the door of St. Patrick's Cathedral, New York City.

Kateri Tekawitha is referenced in the 2017 novel Future Home of the Living God by Louise Erdrich, as an inspiration for the main character Cedar Hawk Songmaker.

Legacy

After Tekakwitha's beatification in 1980, Paula E. Holmes, in the late 1990s, interviewed several elderly Native American women about their childhoods and hearing stories from their ancestors about Tekakwitha. One woman retold her time in a church where her grandmother told her that she prayed to Kateri for her. One semiretired nurse from New Mexico told Holmes about her aunt's fondness of Kateri and how people would travel to New York to learn about her. The nurse's cousin told Holmes how her mother kept pictures of Kateri wrapped in fur and gave her a Tekakwitha medal. Holmes then stated that Kateri is "as part of their Indian familiar and familial heritage."

Clarence A. Walworth (d. 1900) was one of the strongest proponents of Tekakwitha's veneration. Because Walworth was so interested in Native American history, he researched Tekakwitha's life and promoted her cause with his niece, Ellen. He then personally financed a $1,000 granite monument in Kahnawake out of a gesture for international co-operation for her veneration.

In traditional fashion, numerous churches, schools and other Catholic institutions have been named for her, particularly since her canonization, including several Catholic elementary schools. Among these are St. Kateri Tekakwitha Catholic Elementary School in Kitchener, Kateri Tekakwitha Catholic Elementary School in Markham, St. Kateri Tekakwitha Catholic Elementary School in Hamilton, Saint Kateri Tekakwitha Catholic School in Orléans (Ottawa), and St. Kateri Tekakwitha School in Calgary, Alberta. In the United States, St. Kateri Tekakwitha Catholic Churches are Dearborn, MI and Buffalo, TX. in Saint Kateri is the patron saint of John Cabot Catholic Secondary School in Mississauga.

The St. Kateri Tekakwitha School in Niskayuna, New York was named after her canonization. The St. Kateri Tekakwitha Parish, located in adjacent Schenectady, was founded by merging the Our Lady of Fatima and St. Helen's churches in late 2012. A cluster parish was formed in Irondequoit, New York, in 2010, taking the name Blessed Kateri Parish; the name was later changed to Saint Kateri after her canonization. Kateri Residence, an Archdiocese of New York Catholic Charities nursing home in Manhattan, New York, is named for her.

The St. Kateri Tekakwitha Church in Santa Clarita, California, holds a statue of her in the church. A statue of Saint Kateri Tekakwitha stands at the steps of Holy Cross School at San Buenaventura Mission in southern California; it references the local Native American Chumash people, who helped build and sustain the Mission until the 1840s.

Since 1939, the Tekakwitha Conference meets annually to support Catholic missions among Native Americans. People gather in Kateri Circles to pray together and become better Catholics. In 1991, the conference reported 130 registered Kateri Circles.

The chapel of Welsh Family Hall at the University of Notre Dame, built in 1997, is dedicated to Kateri Tekakwitha.

Tekakwitha Island (French: île Tekakwitha) in the St-Lawrence River, part of the Kahnawake reserve, is named after her.

On April 4, 2021, on Easter Sunday, the only Catholic Church at St. Theresa Point in Northern Manitoba, Canada, burned down. The only things that were left after the rubble was an image of St. Kateri Tekakwitha, almost completely intact as well as a Mary statue.

In May 2021, a church that was built in St. Kateri's honour for the second time burned on the Bay Mills Indian Community in the Upper Peninsula of Michigan.

References

Further reading
 Beauchamp, W.M. "Mohawk Notes," Journal of American Folk-Lore, vol. 8, Boston, 1895, pp. 217–221. Also, "Iroquois Women," Journal of American Folk-Lore, vol. 13, Boston, 1900, pp. 81–91.
 Béchard, Henri, S.J. The Original Caughnawaga Indians. Montreal: International Publishers, 1976.
 Béchard, Henri, S.J. "Tekakwitha." Dictionary of Canadian Biography (Toronto: University of Toronto Press, 1966), vol. 1.
 Bunson, Matthew and Margaret Bunson. Saint Kateri: Lily of the Mohawks (Huntington, IN: Our Sunday Visitor, 2012) .
 Cholonec, Rev. Pierre. "Kateri Tekakwitha: The Iroquois Saint." (Merchantville, NJ: Evolution Publishing, 2012) .
 Cohen, Leonard. "Beautiful Losers," Published in 1966 by McClelland and Stewart.
 Fenton, William, and Elisabeth Tooker. "Mohawk," in Handbook of North American Indians, Volume 15: Northeast, edited by Bruce G. Trigger. Washington DC: Smithsonian Institution, 1978.
 Greer, Allan. Mohawk Saint: Catherine Tekakwitha and the Jesuits. Oxford: Oxford University Press, 2005
 Hewitt, J.N.B. "The Iroquoian Concept of the Soul," Journal of American Folk-Lore, vol. 8, Boston, 1895, pp. 107–116.
 Lecompte, Edward, S.J. Glory of the Mohawks: The Life of the Venerable Catherine Tekakwitha, translated by Florence Ralston Werum, FRSA. Milwaukee: Bruce Publishing Co., 1944.
 Litkowski, Mary Pelagia, O.P. Kateri Tekakwitha: Joyful Lover. Battle Creek, Michigan: Growth Unlimited Inc., 1989.
 Newman, Andrew, Allegories of Encounter: Colonial Literacy and Indian Captivities (Williamsburg, VA and Chapel Hill: Omohundro Institute of Early American History and Culture/University of North Carolina Press, 2019), especially Chapter 4 (pages 111–137).
 O Connell, Victor. Eaglechild Kanata Publications, Hamilton, Ontario 2016
 Sargent, Daniel. Catherine Tekakwitha. New York and Toronto: Longmans, Green and Co., 1936.
 Shoemaker, Nancy. "Kateri Tekakwitha's Tortuous Path to Sainthood," in Nancy Shoemaker, ed. Negotiators of Change: Historical Perspectives on Native American Women (New York: Routledge, 1995), pp. 49–71.
 Steckley, John. Beyond Their Years: Five Native Women's Stories, Canadian Scholars Press 1999 
 Weiser, Francis X., S.J. Kateri Tekakwitha. Caughnawaga, Canada: Kateri Center, 1972.

External links

 
 Kateri Tekakwitha website 
 "Blessed Kateri Tekakwitha", Catholic Forum
 "Kateri's Life", Lily of the Mohawks website
 "Blessed Kateri, Model Ecologist", Conservation
 
 Barbara Bradley Hagerty, "A Boy, An Injury, A Recovery, A Miracle?", NPR, 4 November 2011
 LORRAINE MALLINDER, "Holy Rivalry Over Kateri", Montreal Gazette, 20 March 2010
 "Masochism and Sainthood: Kateri Tekakwitha and Junípero Serra," by Daniel Fogel
 The homily preached by Pope Benedict XVI at the canonization of Kateri Tekakwitha October 21, 2012
 "Sketch of Life of Indian Maid, Kateri Tekakwitha" from April 23, 1915 issue of the Recorder-Democrat a semiweekly publication, Amsterdam, NY
 Account of location of Ossernon birthplace written by Jesuit Fr. Loyzance (the original purchaser of the land at Auriesville) from St. Johnsville Enterprise and News November 28, 1934
 Video showing the Shrine and Village from 2016

1656 births
1680 deaths
American Mohawk people
Converts to Roman Catholicism from pagan religions
Native American Roman Catholics
Religious figures of the indigenous peoples of North America
17th-century Christian saints
People from Montgomery County, New York
Canadian Roman Catholic saints
American Roman Catholic saints
Christian female saints of the Early Modern era
Beatifications by Pope John Paul II
Canonizations by Pope Benedict XVI
Catholics from New York (state)
Indigenous Roman Catholic saints of the Americas
17th-century Native American women
Anglican saints
17th-century Native Americans
Native American people from New York (state)